J. Kessels is a 2015 Dutch drama film directed by Erik de Bruyn. It was listed as one of eleven films that could be selected as the Dutch submission for the Best Foreign Language Film at the 89th Academy Awards, but it was not nominated.

Cast
 Fedja van Huêt as Frans
 Frank Lammers as Kessels
 Ruben van der Meer as Boontje
 Livia Matthes as Sabine

References

External links
 

2015 films
2015 drama films
Dutch drama films
2010s Dutch-language films
Films set in Hamburg